Marib  is an airport which was designated for construction in 2018 to serve the town of Ma'rib in Yemen. Its construction was suspended indefinitely due to political reasons after being awarded to a contracting company.

See also
Transport in Yemen

References

External links
 OurAirports - Yemen
  Great Circle Mapper - Marib
 Marib
 Project Completion

Airports in Yemen